The 1915 Arizona Wildcats football team was an American football team that represented the University of Arizona as an independent during the 1915 college football season. In its second season under head coach Pop McKale, the team compiled a 5–3 record and outscored opponents, 152 to 34. The team captain was William Asa Porter.

Schedule

References

Arizona
Arizona Wildcats football seasons
Arizona Wildcats football